Tagdal (Tuareg name: Tagdalt) is a mixed Northern Songhay language of central Niger. Ethnologue considers it a "mixed Berber–Songhay language", while other researchers consider it Northern Songhay. There are two dialects: Tagdal proper, spoken by the Igdalen people, pastoralists who inhabit a region to the east along the Niger border to Tahoua in Niger, and Tabarog, spoken by the Iberogan people of the Azawagh valley on the Niger–Mali border.

Nicolaï (1981) uses the name Tihishit as a cover term. Rueck & Christiansen say that

...the Igdalen and the Iberogan have for many purposes been treated as one group, and their speech forms are closely related. Nicolaï uses "tihishit" as a common designator for these two speech forms...; however, this term is ambiguous. "Tihishit" is a term of Tamajaq origin meaning "the language of the blacks". The Igdalen and Iberogan used it to refer to all Northern Songhay speech forms.

Meanwhile, the Iberogan sometimes refer to their language as Tagdal.

Grammar 
Tagdal is an agglutinative language, most likely due to Tuareg influence.

Pronouns 
Tagdal gets its pronominal system from Northern Songhay languages.

Subject prefixes:

Tadgal has two different prefixes used for negation. The first is nɘ-, which functions as perfective negation, and is the default choice for negation. It indicates something that might have happened in the past, but didn't, or in the case of stative verbs, something that is not true. The other negation prefix is sɘ-, which acts as a negation in the present or future. Uses of this negation are shown in these examples:

ɣɑnɘkoy: I did not go

ɣɑsɘbkoy: I was not going/I do not (habitually) go

ɣɑnəyɑrdɑ: I disagree

References

Tuareg languages
Languages of Niger
Songhay languages
Mixed languages